Jesse David Chavez (born August 21, 1983) is an American professional baseball pitcher in the Atlanta Braves organization. He played college baseball at Riverside Community College, and was drafted by the Texas Rangers in the 42nd round of the 2002 Major League Baseball Draft. He has also played in Major League Baseball (MLB) for the Pittsburgh Pirates, Atlanta Braves, Kansas City Royals, Toronto Blue Jays, Oakland Athletics, Los Angeles Dodgers, Los Angeles Angels, Texas Rangers, and Chicago Cubs.

Amateur career
Chavez was born in San Gabriel, California. A graduate of Fontana A.B. Miller High School in Fontana, California, Chavez later attended Riverside Community College, where he spent two seasons. During his freshman season at Riverside, Chavez went 13–2 with a 1.96 ERA and 11–5 with a 1.93 ERA for his sophomore season.

Professional career
Chavez was originally drafted in the 39th round out of high school by the Chicago Cubs, but opted to attend college instead. Chavez was later drafted by the Texas Rangers in the 2002 Major League Baseball Draft out of Riverside Community College. In 2006 Chavez was promoted to Triple-A Oklahoma where he pitched one game before being traded.

Pittsburgh Pirates
The Rangers traded Chavez to the Pittsburgh Pirates for Kip Wells on July 31, 2006. He was assigned to the Triple-A Indianapolis Indians where he pitched the rest of the season and all of 2007.

Chavez appeared in 51 games for the Indians in 2007, pitching to a 3.80 earned run average (ERA), and was promoted to the majors on August 27, making his debut the same day. He had a 4.48 ERA in 82 innings pitched for the Pirates from 2008 to 2009.

Atlanta Braves
The Pirates traded Chavez on November 3, 2009, to the Tampa Bay Rays in exchange for second baseman Akinori Iwamura. On December 10, he was traded again, to the Atlanta Braves for Rafael Soriano.

He had a 5.89 ERA in 36 innings pitched for the Braves in 2010.

Kansas City Royals
On July 31, 2010, Chavez was traded to the Kansas City Royals along with Gregor Blanco and Tim Collins for Rick Ankiel and Kyle Farnsworth. The Royals designated him for assignment on October 11, 2011.

He had a 6.95 ERA in 33 innings pitched for the Royals from 2010 to 2011.

Toronto Blue Jays
On October 21, 2011, he was claimed off waivers by the Toronto Blue Jays. He was designated for assignment on December 12 but cleared waivers and was outrighted to Triple-A.

On May 27, 2012, Chavez was called up from the Triple-A Las Vegas 51s. He was 6–2 with a 3.72 ERA in 10 games with Las Vegas.
He was recalled on August 4. On August 5, however, he was sent back down to make room for the promotion of Chad Jenkins from the New Hampshire Fisher Cats.

Oakland Athletics
Chavez was traded to the Oakland Athletics on August 24, 2012, in exchange for cash considerations.

Chavez began the 2013 season with the Triple-A Sacramento River Cats. He was recalled by Oakland on April 20, and sent back to Sacramento on April 29. He was recalled again on May 10. On June 13, Chavez pitched 5 shutout innings of relief in an 18-inning game against the New York Yankees, earning the win. On July 31, Chavez pitched against the Blue Jays for the first time since being traded to Oakland and took the loss, yielding 3 runs in the 10th inning.

Chavez was added to Oakland's starting rotation to open the 2014 season, due to the spring injuries of Jarrod Parker and A.J. Griffin. He set career highs in starts and innings pitched, and finished with an 8–8 record with a 3.45 ERA.

On January 12, 2015, Chavez and the Athletics agreed to a one-year deal worth $2.15 million, avoiding arbitration. Chavez was placed in the bullpen to start the season. On April 23, he was moved to the rotation and ended up making 26 starts for Oakland, a career high, pitching to a 7–15 record and a 4.18 ERA. His season ended in mid-September when he was diagnosed with a non-displaced fracture in his ribs.

Toronto Blue Jays (second stint)
On November 20, 2015, the Athletics traded Chavez to the Blue Jays for Liam Hendriks. He and the Blue Jays did not come to an agreement before the salary arbitration deadline on January 15, 2016. Chavez was seeking $4 million, while the Blue Jays countered at $3.6 million. On February 6, it was announced that Chavez had won his arbitration case. Chavez entered spring training in competition for the fifth starter role with Aaron Sanchez, Drew Hutchison, and Gavin Floyd. On March 28, it was announced that Sanchez would be the team's fifth starter, and Chavez would begin the season in the bullpen.  On May 17, 2016, Chavez was suspended for 3 games after he intentionally hit Texas Rangers batter Prince Fielder on May 15 after the Blue Jays and Rangers had a bench clearing brawl in the top of the 8th that resulted in Rougned Odor punching José Bautista after Bautista slid hard into Odor to break up a double play. Chavez pitched to a 1–2 record, 4.57 ERA, and 42 strikeouts in 41 innings before being traded.

Los Angeles Dodgers
On August 1, 2016, the Blue Jays traded Chavez to the Los Angeles Dodgers for Mike Bolsinger. He appeared in 23 games for the Dodgers with a 4.21 ERA.

Los Angeles Angels
On November 11, 2016, Chavez signed a one-year, $5.75 million contract with the Los Angeles Angels. Chavez was chosen to start in the Angels rotation at the beginning of the season due to the bevy of injuries. Chavez made 21 starts, going 5–9 with a 5.24 ERA before being put in the bullpen after the All Star Break. Chavez finished the season 7–11 in 38 games, 21 starts.

Texas Rangers
On February 23, 2018, Chavez signed a one-year contract with the Texas Rangers.

Chicago Cubs
On July 19, 2018, Chavez was acquired by the Chicago Cubs for minor league pitcher Tyler Thomas. Chavez posted an impressive 1.15 ERA in 32 appearances with the Cubs.

Texas Rangers (second stint)
On November 30, 2018, Chavez signed a 2-year contract to return to the Texas Rangers. Chavez was placed on the injured list on August 13 with elbow inflammation, which stemmed from a bone spur. He finished the 2019 season going 3–5 with a 4.85 ERA in 78 innings. Chavez underwent surgery to remove loose bodies from his elbow on September 9. The following season, Chavez struggled mightily to the tune of a 6.88 ERA in 17 innings.

Los Angeles Angels (second stint)
On February 26, 2021, Chavez signed a minor league contract with the Los Angeles Angels organization that included an invitation to spring training. On March 26, 2021, Chavez was released by the Angels.

Atlanta Braves (second stint)
On April 17, 2021, Chavez signed a minor league contract with the Atlanta Braves organization. On June 24, Chavez was selected to the active roster. In 2021 he was 3–2 with a 2.14 ERA in 30 games (4 starts) in which he pitched 33.2 innings. In the 2021 postseason, Chavez made 7 appearances for the Braves, including starting Game 4 of the NLCS, and did not surrender any runs.

Chicago Cubs (second stint)
On March 13, 2022, Chavez signed a minor league split contract with the Chicago Cubs. On April 2, 2022, the Cubs selected the contract of Chavez.

Atlanta Braves (third stint)
On April 20, 2022, Chavez along with cash considerations were traded to the Atlanta Braves for Sean Newcomb.

Los Angeles Angels (third stint)
On August 2, 2022, Chavez and Tucker Davidson were traded from the Braves to the Los Angeles Angels for Raisel Iglesias. During the 2022 season, Chavez set the record for most trades in a Major League Baseball career, with ten.

On August 29, Chavez was released by the Angels. In 11 games, Chavez posted a 7.59 ERA.

Atlanta Braves (fourth stint)
On August 30, 2022, Chavez was claimed off waivers by the Atlanta Braves. On November 12, Chavez signed a 1-year minor league contract with the Braves. He was invited to major league spring training before the 2023 regular season began.

Personal life
Chavez and his wife, Crystal, have three children together.

References

External links

1983 births
Living people
American baseball players of Mexican descent
American expatriate baseball players in Canada
Atlanta Braves players
Bakersfield Blaze players
Baseball players from California
Chicago Cubs players
Clinton LumberKings players
Frisco RoughRiders players
Gigantes del Cibao players
American expatriate baseball players in the Dominican Republic
Grand Canyon Rafters players
Gwinnett Stripers players
Indianapolis Indians players
Kansas City Royals players
Las Vegas 51s players
Los Angeles Dodgers players
Los Angeles Angels players
Major League Baseball pitchers
Oakland Athletics players
Oklahoma RedHawks players
Omaha Storm Chasers players
People from San Gabriel, California
Phoenix Desert Dogs players
Pittsburgh Pirates players
Riverside City Tigers baseball players
Sacramento River Cats players
Spokane Indians players
Texas Rangers players
Tomateros de Culiacán players
American expatriate baseball players in Mexico
Toronto Blue Jays players
People from Victorville, California
Anchorage Glacier Pilots players